Eho Sta Matia Ourano (Greek: Έχω Στα Μάτια Ουρανό; English: I Have The Sky In My Eyes) is the fourteenth studio album by Greek artist, Katy Garbi. It was released on 6 May 2005 by Sony BMG Greece and received gold certification, selling over 20,000 units*. Christos Dantis composed all the album and also performs a duet in the song "Spaciba Baby". Katy promoted three of her songs on ANT1 show Fame Story 3 before album's release. It contains pop and modern laika songs and is Katy's last collaboration with her producer, Giannis Doulamis, who was the producer of all her albums since her debut album Prova.

In 2005, gold was the album whose sales exceeded 20,000 units.

Track listing

Singles
The following singles were officially released to radio stations with music videos, except the songs "Eho Sta Matia Ourano" and "To Narkotiko Mou". The songs "Teleia Kai Pavla" and "Moni Mou Gia Parti Mou" were not released as singles, but gained a lot of airplay.

"Akouse, Agori Mou"

"Akouse, Agori Mou" was the lead single and released on 4 April 2005 with music video, directed by Giorgos Gkavalos. She performed it on Mad Video Music Awards 2005 and gained massive radio airplay becoming a summer hit.

"Eho Sta Matia Ourano"

"Eho Sta Matia Ourano" was the second single and released on 9 May 2003, a few days after album's release, having a successful airplay until today.

"To Narkotiko Mou"

"To Narkotiko Mou" was the third single and released on 6 June 2005 and had a good airplay.

"Spaciba Baby"

"Spaciba Baby" was the fourth and last single and released on 11 July 2005 with music video, directed by Giorgos Gkavalos. The song had a successful airplay on radios and TV shows.

Credits
Credits adapted from liner notes.

Personnel 

 Antonis Andreou – trombone (tracks: 7)
 Vanias Apergis – orchestration at interlude (tracks: 10)
 Christina Argiri – backing vocals (tracks: 6, 7)
 Christos Dantis – orchestration, programming, keyboards (tracks: 1, 2, 4, 5, 6, 7, 8, 9, 10, 12, 13) / guitars (tracks: 2, 4, 5) / backing vocals (tracks: 1, 2, 6, 7, 10, 12) / second vocal (tracks: 3, 9, 11)
 Tasos Gouras – keyboards (tracks: 3, 11)
 Katerina Kiriakou – backing vocals (tracks: 6, 7)
 Giorgos Kostoglou – bass (tracks: 3, 4, 6, 7, 9, 11, 13)
 Giannis Lionakis – orchestration, programming (tracks: 3, 11) / guitars (tracks: 1, 3, 6, 7, 8, 9, 11, 12, 13) / lute (tracks: 8) / baglama (tracks: 3, 6, 7, 9, 11)
 Alkis Misirlis – drums (tracks: 3, 4, 6, 7, 9, 11, 13)
 Alex Panagi – backing vocals (tracks: 6, 7)
 Ilias Pourtsidis – bouzouki (tracks: 12)
 Nikos Sakellarakis – trumpet (tracks: 7)
 Panagiotis Stergiou – bouzouki (tracks: 3, 6, 7, 9, 11, 13) / cura, oud (tracks: 13)
 Natasa Zenetzi – second vocal (tracks: 8)

Production 

 Aris Binis (Vox studio) – sound engineer, mix engineer
 Giannis Doulamis – production manager
 Nikolas Georgiou – styling
 Giannis Ioannidis (Digital Press Hellas) – mastering
 Freddy Kalobratsos – make up
 Christina Papas – cover processing
 Petros Paraschis – art direction
 Trifon Samaras – hair styling
 Petros Siakavellas (Digital Press Hellas) – mastering

Charts
Eho Sta Matia Ourano made its debut at number 2 on the 'Top 50 Greek Albums' charts by IFPI.

After months, it was certified gold according to sales.

References

2005 albums
Katy Garbi albums
Sony Music Greece albums
Greek-language albums